Abel Ruiz Ortega (born 28 January 2000) is a Spanish professional footballer who plays as a forward for Primeira Liga club Braga and the Spain national team.

Formed at Barcelona, where he made one first-team appearance, he moved to Braga in January 2020, where he won the Taça de Portugal in 2021.

Ruiz set the record for caps and goals for Spain's under-17 team, winning the European Championship in 2017 and finishing runners-up in 2016 and at the 2017 World Cup. He made his senior international debut in 2021.

Club career

Barcelona
Born in Almussafes, Valencian Community, Ruiz joined Barcelona's youth setup in 2012, from Valencia. On 21 November 2016, he renewed his contract with the club.

On 9 April 2017, while still a junior, Ruiz made his senior debut with the reserves, coming on as a late substitute for Jesús Alfaro in a 2–0 Segunda División B away win against Badalona; he also became the first player born in the 2000s to make an appearance for the club's senior ranks. 

After Barcelona B's promotion, Ruiz made his professional team debut on 28 August 2017, replacing David Concha in an 3–0 home loss against Tenerife in the Segunda División championship. Four days later he scored his first professional goal in a 2–2 draw against Granada.

Ruiz had his first-team debut in the Supercopa de Catalunya on 7 March 2018, scoring the winning penalty in a shootout against Espanyol. His La Liga debut came on 12 May 2019 in a 2–0 win against Getafe, as a substitute for Philippe Coutinho for the final 21 minutes at the Camp Nou.

Braga
On 31 January 2020, Ruiz joined Portugal's Braga on loan for the rest of the season, with a mandatory purchase for €8 million and a buy-back clause. He made his debut on 20 February in the round of 32 first leg of the UEFA Europa League away to Rangers, starting the game and scoring in a 3–2 loss. Totalling eight appearances over the season, he scored his first Primeira Liga goal on 4 July soon after entering in a 4–0 home win over Aves.

Ruiz was the top scorer in the Taça de Portugal as Braga won it in 2020–21, contributing seven goals in as many games. This included two in a 3–2 win away to Porto in the semi-finals.

In 2021–22, Ruiz scored in each leg of a 3–1 aggregate win over Monaco in the Europa League last 16. He netted the only goal of the game in the next fixture against Rangers, though the Scots won 3–2 over the two games after extra time.

International career
Ruiz made his debut for the Spain under-17 team on 25 October 2015, starting and scoring the first in a 2–0 2016 UEFA European Under-17 Championship qualification win against Andorra. He was also named in the list for the finals in Azerbaijan, despite being one year younger than his teammates.

Ruiz finished the competition with four goals, being awarded the Silver Boot; he was also included in the tournament's best eleven. During the 2017 edition in Croatia, he captained the side as Spain achieved their ninth title.

On 22 September 2017, Ruiz was included in Santiago Denia's squad ahead of the 2017 FIFA U-17 World Cup, and scored two braces in the tournament, scoring two goals in a 4–0 win against Niger on 10 October, and two more in a 3–1 semi-finals win against Mali on 25 October.

Due to the isolation of some national team players following the positive COVID-19 test of Sergio Busquets, Spain's under-21 squad were called up for the international friendly against Lithuania on 8 June 2021. Ruiz made his senior debut in the 4–0 win in Leganés, missing a penalty in the match.

Career statistics

Club

International

Honours
Barcelona Youth
UEFA Youth League: 2017–18

Barcelona
La Liga: 2018–19

Braga
Taça de Portugal: 2020–21

Spain U17
UEFA European Under-17 Championship: 2017; runner-up: 2016
FIFA Under-17 World Cup runner-up: 2017

Spain U18
Mediterranean Games: 2018

Spain U19
UEFA European Under-19 Championship: 2019

Individual
UEFA European Under-17 Championship Silver Boot: 2016
UEFA European Under-17 Championship Team of the Tournament: 2017
FIFA Under-17 World Cup Bronze Boot: 2017 (6 goals)
Mediterranean Games top scorer: 2018 (7 goals)
Taça de Portugal top scorer: 2020-21 (7 goals)

Records
Top goalscorer in the history of UEFA European Under-17 Championship finals: 8 goals (shared with Amine Gouiri and Odsonne Édouard)
Top goalscorer in the history of UEFA European Under-17 Championship: 16 goals (shared with José Gomes)
Top goalscorer in the history of the Spain under-17 team: 27 goals.
Most-capped player in the history of the Spain under-17 team: 37 appearances.

References

External links

FC Barcelona official profile

2000 births
Living people
People from Ribera Baixa
Sportspeople from the Province of Valencia
Spanish footballers
Footballers from the Valencian Community
Association football forwards
La Liga players
Segunda División players
Segunda División B players
Primeira Liga players
FC Barcelona players
FC Barcelona Atlètic players
S.C. Braga players
Spain youth international footballers
Spain under-21 international footballers
Spain international footballers
Competitors at the 2018 Mediterranean Games
Mediterranean Games gold medalists for Spain
Mediterranean Games medalists in football
Spanish expatriate footballers
Expatriate footballers in Portugal
Spanish expatriate sportspeople in Portugal